The Intangible Cultural Heritage (Muhyeong Munhwajae) are aspects of intangible culture that the government of South Korea has officially designated for preservation in accordance with the 1962 Cultural Property Protection Law. They are proclaimed and maintained by South Korea's Cultural Heritage Administration.

Practices of particular importance can be designated as Important Intangible Cultural Properties (Jungyo Muhyeong Munhwajae).

The first practice so designated was Jongmyo jeryeak, the ancient music and dance performed at the Jongmyo Royal Ancestral Shrine in Seoul; it was proclaimed on December 7, 1964. The most recent, announced on November 16, 2006, was Important Intangible Cultural Property 119, geumbakjang (gold leaf decoration), practiced in Seongnam, Gyeonggi-do.

A similarly named yet distinct designation, "Intangible Cultural Properties," also exists, with 33 items having been proclaimed. These are proclaimed by provinces or cities rather than by the national Cultural Heritage Administration.

The 1962 Cultural Property Protection Law was modelled on the Japanese 1950 Law for the Protection of Cultural Properties, which provides for the designation of Intangible Cultural Properties as well as the holders of these craft and performance traditions, known informally as Living National Treasures. These early initiatives at a national level influenced UNESCO in its approach to intangible cultural heritage, leading to the 2003 Convention for the Safeguarding of Intangible Cultural Heritage. As of April 2012, fourteen Korean Intangible Cultural Properties have been inscribed on the UNESCO Representative List of the Intangible Cultural Heritage of Humanity.

List

Proclaimed 1960–1969

Proclaimed 1970–1979

Proclaimed 1980–1989

Proclaimed 1990–1999

Proclaimed 2000–2009

Proclaimed 2010–2019

Proclaimed 2020–2029

See also
 National Treasure (South Korea)
 Historic Sites of South Korea
 Intangible culture
 Living National Treasure
 Cultural heritage management
 Living National Treasure (Japan)
 Philippine Registry of Cultural Property
 National Commission for Culture and the Arts

References

External links

 Cultural Heritage Administration of Korea
 Korean Traditional Crafted Works (2009 exhibition of works by designated artisans)
  Korea National Heritage Online

Korean culture
1964 establishments in South Korea